NGC 1555, sometimes known as Hind's Variable Nebula, is a variable nebula, illuminated by the star T Tauri, located in the constellation Taurus. It is also in the second  Sharpless catalog as 238. It is a Herbig–Haro object. The nebula was discovered on October 11, 1852, by John Russell Hind.

See also
NGC 2261

References

External links

Galaxy Map Sharpless 238 

Diffuse nebulae
Taurus (constellation)
1555
Sharpless objects
Herbig–Haro objects
Astronomical objects discovered in 1852